This is a list of tribal colleges and universities by country. Note that some universities or colleges historically have served a largely indigenous population without being associated with any tribe; such institutions are not part of this list.

Canada

Alberta
 Maskwachees Cultural College
 Old Sun Community College, Siksika 146
 Red Crow Community College, Cardston
 University nuhelot’įne thaiyots’į nistameyimâkanak Blue Quills,  	St. Paul
 Yellowhead Tribal College, Edmonton

British Columbia
 Native Education Centre, Vancouver
 Nicola Valley Institute of Technology, Merritt

Manitoba
 University College of the North
 Yellowquill College, Winnipeg

Nunavut
 Akitsiraq Law School
 Nunavut Arctic College

Ontario
 Anishinabek Education Institute 
 First Nations Technical Institute, Tyendinaga Mohawk Territory
 Kenjgewin Teg Educational Institute
 Iohahi:io Akwesasne Adult Education Centre
 Negahneewin College, Thunder Bay
 Ogwehoweh Skills and Trades Training Centre
 Oshki-Pimache-O-Win Education & Training Institute
 Seven Generations Education Institute
 Shingwauk Kinoomaage Gamig
 Six Nations Polytechnic

Saskatchewan
 First Nations University of Canada
 Gabriel Dumont Institute
 Saskatchewan Indian Institute of Technologies

Malaysia
 Universiti Teknologi MARA
 MARA Junior Science College

New Zealand

Te Awamutu
 Te Wānanga o Aotearoa

Ōtaki
 Te Wānanga o Raukawa

Whakatane
 Te Whare Wānanga o Awanuiārangi

The Philippines

Davao
 Pamulaan Center for Indigenous Peoples

United States

Alaska
 Iḷisaġvik College, Utqiaġvik, Alaska

Arizona
 Diné College, Tsaile, Arizona
 Tohono O'odham Community College, Sells, Arizona

California
 D–Q University, Yolo County, California, defunct

Kansas
 Haskell Indian Nations University, Lawrence, Kansas

Michigan
 Bay Mills Community College, Brimley, Michigan
 Keweenaw Bay Ojibwa Community College, Baraga, Michigan
 Saginaw Chippewa Tribal College, Mount Pleasant, Michigan

Minnesota
 Fond du Lac Tribal and Community College, Cloquet, Minnesota
 Leech Lake Tribal College, Cass Lake, Minnesota
 Red Lake Nation College, Red Lake, Minnesota
 White Earth Tribal and Community College, Mahnomen, Minnesota

Montana
 Aaniiih Nakoda College, Harlem, Montana
 Blackfeet Community College, Browning, Montana 
 Chief Dull Knife College, Lame Deer, Montana
 Fort Peck Community College, Poplar, Montana
 Little Big Horn College, Crow Agency, Montana
 Salish Kootenai College, Pablo, Montana
 Stone Child College, Box Elder, Montana

Nebraska
 Little Priest Tribal College, Winnebago, Nebraska
 Nebraska Indian Community College, Macy, Nebraska

New Mexico
 Institute of American Indian Arts, Santa Fe, New Mexico
 Navajo Technical University, Crownpoint, New Mexico
 Southwestern Indian Polytechnic Institute, Albuquerque, New Mexico

North Dakota
 Cankdeska Cikana Community College, Fort Totten, North Dakota 
 Nueta Hidatsa Sahnish College, New Town, North Dakota
 Sitting Bull College, Fort Yates, North Dakota
 Turtle Mountain Community College, Belcourt, North Dakota
 United Tribes Technical College, Bismarck, North Dakota

North Carolina
 University of North Carolina at Pembroke, Pembroke, North Carolina

Oklahoma
 Bacone College, Muskogee, Oklahoma, established 1880 (Native American-Serving, NonTribal Institution)
 Cheyenne and Arapaho Tribal College, Weatherford, Oklahoma (defunct)
 College of the Muscogee Nation, Okmulgee, Oklahoma
 Comanche Nation College, Lawton, Oklahoma (defunct)
 Pawnee Nation College, Pawnee, Oklahoma (Not Accredited)

South Dakota
 Oglala Lakota College, Kyle, South Dakota
 Sinte Gleska University, Mission, South Dakota
 Sisseton Wahpeton College, Sisseton, South Dakota

Washington
 Northwest Indian College, Bellingham, Washington

Wisconsin
 College of Menominee Nation, Keshena, Wisconsin
 Lac Courte Oreilles Ojibwa Community College, Hayward, Wisconsin

Wyoming
 Wind River Tribal College, Ethete, Wyoming

References

Tribal colleges and universities
Tribal colleges and universities
Tribal colleges and universities

Indigenous peoples in Canada-related lists